Route 313 is a Connecticut state highway in the outer northwestern New Haven suburbs, running from Seymour to Woodbridge.

Route description
Route 313 begins at an intersection with Route 67 in Seymour. It heads briefly south along the Naugatuck River and underneath Route 8 without an interchange, then turns east across the Naugatuck River.  It briefly overlaps Route 115 before continuing southeast to the southeast corner of Seymour and crossing into Woodbridge.  In Woodbridge, it continues southeast to end at an intersection with Route 243.

History
The Rimmon Road section of Route 313 in Seymour and Woodbridge was established as the Rimmon Falls Turnpike in 1802; the turnpike was operational until at least 1838. In 1936, the Woodbridge portion of the turnpike (Rimmon Road) was taken over by the state as SR 563. In the 1962 Route Reclassification Act, River Street in Seymour was designated as SR 728, the Broad Street bridge was designated as SR 713, and SR 563 was extended northwest along Maple Street. These three unsigned state roads were combined into Route 313 in 1963 and has had no major changes since.

Junction list

References

External links

313
Transportation in New Haven County, Connecticut